Love, Peace & Nappiness is the second album by the Queens, New York, hip hop group Lost Boyz. "Me and My Crazy World" was a Billboard Hot 100 hit.

The album was certified Gold by the RIAA on September 17, 1997.

Critical reception
The Washington Post wrote that "chief rappers Mr. Cheeks and Freaky Tah have the Lost Boyz formula down pat, combining live instrumentation—which provides for warmer grooves—with smoothly sung choruses for an even more radio-friendly vibe."

Track listing

Charts

Weekly charts

Year-end charts

Certifications

Singles Chart Positions

References

1997 albums
Lost Boyz albums
Albums produced by Bink (record producer)
Albums produced by Easy Mo Bee